Kristin Dattilo (born November 30, 1970) is an American television actress, known for playing manager Yola Gaylen on The Chris Isaak Show from 2001 to 2004 and detective Barbara Gianna in season 3 of Dexter.

Early life 
Dattilo was born in Kankakee, Illinois. She is the sister of fellow actor Bryan Dattilo.

Career 
She played the character Nikki Chandler in the 1990 horror film Mirror, Mirror. In 1999, she was Ross Geller's love interest in an episode of Friends. She appeared on an episode of CSI: Crime Scene Investigation, and three episodes of Tracey Takes On..., and made many other television appearances, including Beverly Hills, 90210, Hull High, Angel, Grounded for Life, Veronica Mars and Two and a Half Men.

Dattilo played the titular character in the music video of Aerosmith's 1989 song "Janie's Got a Gun".

Filmography

Film

Television

References

External links

1970 births
Actresses from Illinois
American television actresses
Living people
People from Kankakee, Illinois
21st-century American women